Discharge may refer to

Expel or let go
 Discharge, the act of firing a gun
 Discharge, or termination of employment, the end of an employee's duration with an employer
 Military discharge, the release of a member of the armed forces from service

Flow
 Discharge (hydrology), the amount of water flowing through the channel
 Effluent released into a river or sea
 Groundwater discharge, the volumetric flow rate of groundwater through an aquifer
 Discharging method (discrete mathematics) is a proof technique in discrete mathematics
 Electric discharge:
 Corona discharge, a type of electric current
 Direct-current discharge, a plasma
 Discharger, an electrical device that releases stored energy
 Battery discharging
 Static discharger, a device used on airplanes to maintain use of electrical equipment
 Electrostatic discharge, sudden and momentary electric current flows between two objects
 Dielectric barrier discharge, the electrical discharge between two electrodes separated by an insulating dielectric barrier
 Gas-discharge lamp, a light bulb that includes a discharge gas
 Partial discharge, a temporary breakdown of electrical insulation

Government and Law
 Discharge (sentence), a criminal sentence where no punishment is imposed
 Bankruptcy discharge, the injunction that bars acts to enforce certain debts
 Discharge petition, the process of bringing a bill out of committee to the floor for a vote without the cooperation of leadership

Healthcare
 Discharge, the flow of fluids from certain parts of the body:
 Menstruation or other vaginal discharge
 Mucopurulent discharge, the emission or secretion of fluid containing mucus and pus
 Nipple discharge, the release of fluid from the nipples of the breasts
 Emotional discharge, in co-counselling, the ways in which pent-up emotional hurt can be released, e.g. via crying, laughter, etc.
 Patient discharge, the formal ending of inpatient care

Music
 Discharge (album), a self-titled album by Discharge released in 2002
 Discharge (band), British hardcore punk band
 "Discharge", a song by Anthrax from Persistence of Time